The RC Cola-Army Troopers were a professional women's volleyball team in the Philippine Super Liga (PSL). It debuted as the RC Cola Raiders in the 2013 Grand Prix Conference of the PSL. The team is owned by ARC Refreshments Corporation, the Philippine licensee of Royal Crown Cola International.

From 2014 to 2015, it partnered with the official women's volleyball team of the Philippine Air Force and played as the RC Cola-Air Force Raiders. For the 2016 season, it partnered with the Philippine Army Lady Troopers and played as the RC Cola-Army Troopers.

Name changes
RC Cola Raiders (2013, Philippine Superliga)  
RC Cola-Air Force Raiders (2014-2015, Philippine Superliga)  
RC Cola-Army Troopers (2016, Philippine Superliga)

Current roster
For the 2016 PSL Invitational Cup:

Coaching staff
 Head coach: Sgt. Emilio Reyes
 Assistant coach(es): Sgt. Rico de Guzman

Team staff
 Team manager: Brigader Gen. Elmer Pabale
 Team Utility: Melody Gutierrez

Medical Staff
 Team Physician: 
 Physical Therapist: Alyssa Paula Tomas

Honors

Team

Individual

Team captains
 Ivy Remulla (2013)
 Wendy Anne Semana (2014 All-Filipino)
 Judy Ann Caballejo (2015 Grand Prix)
 Jovelyn Gonzaga (2016 All-Filipino)
 Cristina Salak (2016 Grand Prix)

Imports

Coaches
 Ronald Dulay (2013)
 Clarence Esteban (2014)
 Rhovyl Verayo (2014-2015)
 Sgt. Emilio Reyes (2016)

Former players

See also
 Philippine Air Force Women's Volleyball Team
 Philippine Army Lady Troopers

References

External links
 PSL-RC Cola Air Force Raiders Page
 2013 Philippine Super Liga Grand Prix Final Results

Philippine Super Liga
2013 establishments in the Philippines
Volleyball clubs established in 2013